The BUS:STOP Krumbach is a construction project of seven bus stops in Krumbach in the Bregenz Forest in Vorarlberg (Austria).

History 
When in 2010 the discussion came up that Krumbach's bus stops had to be rebuilt, the director of the Architekturzentrum Wien, Dietmar Steiner, was tasked with choosing seven international architects who set up exceptional bus stops. These were then manufactured and installed by local architects, local craftsmen and the community of Krumbach.

Awards 

The BUS:STOP Krumbach project has won several awards including the Austrian State Prize for Architecture, the Austrian State Prize for Communication and Public Relations, the Adwin 2015, the Icon of the International Iconic Award and the Innovation Award as "Architects' Client of the Year 2014" and the 2014 award by Vorarlberg Tourismus.

The bus stops

References

External links 

 Official website of the municipality of Krumbach
 Information about the BUS:STOP project in English

Bus transport in Austria
Bus stations in Europe
Transport in Vorarlberg